Çakıllı (former Erenler and Çakalondon)  is a belde (town) in Vize district of Kırklareli Province, Turkey. The earliest inhabitants around Çakıllı were Thracians of the ancient ages. In Middle Ages it was a part of the Byzantine and Ottoman Empires. Turkish traveller Evliya Çelebi described the settlement as  a settlement where Turks and Greeks lived together in the 17th century. After the Russo-Turkish War (1877-1878) Turkish refugees from Bulgaria were also settled in Çakıllı. Çakıllı was declared a seat of township in 1969

References

Populated places in Kırklareli Province
Towns in Turkey
Populated places in Vize District